Michalis Kripintiris (born 8 March 1981) is a Greek footballer. He currently plays for Kalloni F.C. in the Superleague Greece.

Career
Kripintiris previously played for Chaidari F.C., Atromitos F.C. and Ethnikos Asteras F.C. in the Greek Super League.

References

1981 births
Living people
Greek footballers
Chaidari F.C. players
Aiolikos F.C. players
Atromitos F.C. players
Ethnikos Asteras F.C. players
Association football midfielders
People from Mytilene
Sportspeople from the North Aegean